The 65th Regiment Illinois Volunteer Infantry, nicknamed  the "Second Scotch Regiment" was an infantry regiment that served in the Union Army during the American Civil War. The regiment mustered into service in May 1862 and was captured at the Battle of Harper's Ferry. After being paroled and exchanged, the regiment was sent to Kentucky and assigned to the XXIII Corps. The regiment participated in the Knoxville campaign, the Atlanta campaign, the Franklin–Nashville campaign, and the Carolinas campaign. The soldiers were mustered out in July 1865.

Service
The 65th Illinois Infantry was organized at Camp Douglas at Chicago, Illinois and mustered into Federal service on May 1, 1862. Sent to western Virginia, it formed part of the Harper's Ferry garrison that surrendered to the Army of Northern Virginia in September 1862.

After being paroled, the regiment was moved to Kentucky as part of the XXIII Corps and participated in the November–December 1863 Siege of Knoxville. In the spring of 1864, it joined in the Atlanta Campaign and March to the Sea. When the Confederates under General John Hood headed north into Tennessee late in the year, the 65th was part of Col. John S. Casement's brigade, James W. Reilly's 3rd Division sent after him, joining in the battles at Franklin and Nashville. Its final assignment was duty in North Carolina.

The regiment was discharged from service on July 26, 1865.

Total strength and casualties
The regiment suffered 1 officers and 30 enlisted men who were killed in action or mortally wounded and 1 officer and 97 enlisted men who died of disease, for a total of 129 fatalities.

Commanders
 Colonel Daniel Cameron, Jr.
 Colonel William Scott Stewart

See also
List of Illinois Civil War Units
Illinois in the American Civil War
12th Illinois Volunteer Infantry (The First Scotch Regiment)

Notes

References
The Civil War Archive

Units and formations of the Union Army from Illinois
1862 establishments in Illinois
Military units and formations established in 1862
Military units and formations disestablished in 1865

Popular Culture
 Song: "We Are the Gay & Happy Suckers, from the State of Illinois" on IMSLP